The Kuwait Red Fort, or Red Palace, is a historic palace and museum that lies about 32 kilometres west of Kuwait City in Al-Jahra.

The fort was the location of the Battle of Jahra in 1920.

History 

The building of the fort started one year after the accession of Sheikh Mubarak Al-Sabah as seventh ruler of Kuwait in 1897. Its primary purpose was the defense of agriculture in Al-Jahra.

Structure 

The four towers are built with bricks made from mud mixed with local desert shrubs. The towers were designed to give infantrymen a view and line of fire in all directions. The walls around the fort house firing holes for infantrymen and sharpshooters. The fort is almost square, surrounded by a wall about 15 feet high and 2 feet thick, and houses thirty-three rooms and six courtyards. The fort is around 60,720 square feet. The eastern and western walls are 289 and 298  feet long respectively. The northern and southern walls are 211 and 203 feet long respectively.

Well 
It has a well in the center, but its water is salty and not drinkable. During the battle of Jahra, well water was used to treat the wounded and was drunk mixed with date palm to sweeten the taste.

See also 
 Architecture of Kuwait
 List of museums in Kuwait

References 

 Forts in Kuwait
 History of Kuwait
 Museums in Kuwait